Prince Tsangma was the eldest son of King Sadnalegs of Tibet. In Bhutanese traditions, he is held to be the first King of the eastern region.

Sources 
The oldest account of Tsangma is found at Chos 'byung me tog snying po sbrang rtsi'i bcud, which is generally assumed to be a late-twelfth century work by Nyangrel Nyima Özer. Bod kyi srid don rgyal rabs, drafted by Grags pa Rgyal mtshan around late 12th–early 13th century, contains two relevant passages. A similar passage is also found in the late 13th century Chronik Me-tog Phren-w of Nel-pa Pandita. Among later Tibetan sources—with an increasing tendency to martyrize Tsangma—are Sba bzhed zhabs brtags pa, written c. mid 14th century, Rgyal rabs gsal ba'i me long, a work by Dampa Sonam Gyaltsen, and Mkhas pa'i dga' ston, an early 16th century work by Pawo Tsuglag Threngwa.

The oldest source in Bhutanese tradition that covers Tsangma comprehensively is Rgyal rigs ’byung khungs gsal ba’i sgron me (trans. The  Lamp which Illuminates the Origins of Royal Families), written by a monk from East Bhutan in 1678 C.E. Prior to this, the only mention is in the 15th century text of Bshad mdzod yid bzhin nor bu by Don dam Smra ba’i seng ge from East Bhutan.

Biography

Birth 
Both Grags pa Rgyal mtshan and Nel-pa Pandita note Tsangma to be the eldest son of Sadnalegs. While the former did not provide any date of birth, Pandita mentions the Year of Dragon (800 C.E.) Other sources contradict that Tsangma was the eldest.

Exile, Bhutan, and assassination

Tibetan sources 
Both Grags pa Rgyal mtshan and Nel-pa Pandita provide an identical narrative, down to the details: Tsangma was exiled to Bum thang of Lho brag (var. Lho Mon). There, he was poisoned to death by two queens: ’Brom bza’ Legs rje and Sna nam Me rje the’u (var. Sna nam Mang mo rje). In Ardussi's opinion, these were extracted in a piece-meal fashion from some more detailed narrative. The only such extant text by Nyangrel Özer supports such a hypothesis: more additional details are integrated into the same framework. Tsangma, after being poisoned, entered Bhutan via Paro valley and visited the Spyal Ka rock cave to hide religious treasures and royal documents (brought from Tibet), where he was finally interred.

Later Tibetan sources would support this broad narrative—exile, death by poisoning, and a trip to Bhutan—but tweak the details to establish Tsangma as a Buddhist martyr. Pawo Tsuglag Threngwa added that many monks, scholars, and translators had accompanied the exiled Tsangma till the crossing of Gtsang Po where he proclaimed of his innocence but determined to make it to exile, requested them to turn back. Writing in Bod kyi (c. mid-seventeenth century), the Great Fifth outright depicted him to be a seeker of Nirvana.

Bhutanese sources 
Bhutanese sources cite Tibetan sources but skips all mentions of exile and death; instead, an incredibly detailed narrative of his exploits in Bhutan is crafted. According to Rgyal rigs, Tsangma left Western Bhutan after a short stay and embarked eastward, to the Tibetan frontiers of Tawang. However, Tawang was hardly unaffected by the Tibetan struggles of power and hence, he made it back to Btsan mkhar of ’Brog mdo gsum. There, he chose the site of Mi zam pa—an elevated valley, surrounded by rivers—to establish a fort.

Descendants

Tibetan sources 
Neither Grags pa Rgyal mtshan nor Nel-pa Pandita mention anything about his marriage or issues but agree on his descendants ruling over the territories of exile. Later Tibetan sources are silent on these aspects.

Bhutanese sources 
Per Ryal rigs, Tsangpa had married the daughter of one A mi Don grub rgyal, a native of Mi zam pa who claimed descent from the holy A mi Byang chub ’dre bkol. He had two sons from the marriage—Khri mi Lha’i dbang phyug and Gces bu Mthong legs btsun—who succeeded him. Within years, Tsangpa's lineage would command extraordinary fame and Khri mi would be requested to establish hereditary rule over Tawang, where the lineage became known as Khams pa Jo bo. Gces bu stayed as the ruler of Mi zam pa(Mizimpa), and two of his sons—Gong dkar rgyal and Dpal bsked dar—went on to establish rule over adjacent territories. They would be warmly welcomed by the subjects, courtesy associated royal prestige and conferment of political stability. More than twenty different clans are mentioned to have arisen out of the early descendants of Tsangma, who would go on to establish royal authority across Bhutan.

Bshad mdzod simply noted all rulers of Bhutan to have descended from Tsangpa — readers were asked to consult the written records of Tsangpas for further details.

Legacy

Notes

References

Bibliography 

9th-century Tibetan people

Princes

Tibetan royalty